Sir Lady Java, also known simply as Lady Java (born 1943) is an American transgender rights activist, exotic dancer, singer, comedian, and actress. Active on stage, television, radio and film from the mid-1960s to 1970s, she is a popular and influential personality in the Los Angeles-area African-American LGBT community.

Biography

Early life
Born in New Orleans, Louisiana in 1943. Java transitioned at a young age with the support of her mother, and began singing and dancing in local nightclubs.

Career and legal battle
By 1965, she had moved to Los Angeles, California, and become a mainstay of the nightclub circuit, where she was associated with such figures as Redd Foxx, Sammy Davis Jr., Richard Pryor, Flip Wilson, Rudy Ray Moore, LaWanda Page and Don Rickles. She cited Lena Horne, Mae West, and Josephine Baker as inspirations for her performances, which involved dancing, impersonations, singing, and comedy. She was frequently featured in such magazines as Jet, HEP, the LA Advocate, and Variety.

In the early fall of 1967, after a successful two-week engagement at Redd Foxx's club which Java was seeking to extend, the Los Angeles Police Department began shutting down the now-famous Java's performances, citing Rule Number 9, a local ordinance prohibiting the "impersonation by means of costume or dress a person of the opposite sex," and threatening to fine clubs that hosted her. In response, Java picketed Redd Foxx's club on October 21 and hired the American Civil Liberties Union in a bid to overturn the rule. The courts eventually rejected Java's case with the ACLU, stipulating that only club owners could sue. Rule Number 9 ultimately was struck down after a separate dispute in 1969.

In 1978, Java performed with Lena Horne at a birthday party for nightclub owner and columnist Gertrude Gipson.

Later years
From the 1980s, Java kept a lower public profile. Since retiring from performance and recovering from a stroke, she has made a limited return to public life, appearing locally in southern California and giving interviews. In June 2016, she was a guest of honor at the 18th annual Trans Pride L.A. festival alongside CeCe McDonald. Java also participated in the 2022 Los Angeles Pride Parade as Community Grand Marshal. Java has been recognized as a trailblazer.

Filmography

Awards and honors

 1971 – Guest of honor, Alpha Chapter (Los Angeles) of the Full Personality Expression
 2016 – Guest of honor, 18th Annual Trans Pride L.A.

References

External links
 25-minute interview with Sir Lady Java

LGBT African Americans
LGBT people from California
LGBT people from Louisiana
American LGBT rights activists
Living people
People from New Orleans
Transgender rights activists
Transgender women
1943 births